Sanjeev Kumar Diwakar is an Indian politician and member of the 18th Uttar Pradesh Legislative Assembly. He belongs to Bharatiya Janata Party & represented the Jalesar.

References 

Indian politicians
Bharatiya Janata Party politicians
Year of birth missing (living people)
Living people
Uttar Pradesh MLAs 2022–2027